Rediffusion Television (RTV) was the first television station in Hong Kong, making it both the first British colony and the first predominantly ethnically Chinese city to have television. It began as a radio station in 1949 and became Asia Television on 24 September 1982.

History
Radio Rediffusion was officially founded in 1949 as a highly successful wired radio station run by the Rediffusion company.  The radio service was highly successful with its main competitor Commercial Radio. Some of the early contents included plays, stories, concerts and Cantonese operas. The broadcasts were some of the main attraction in Hong Kong tea shops. One of the most famous broadcasters was Li Ngaw: another was Uncle Ray, the pioneering DJ.

It later became a subscription cable television station on 29 May 1957, becoming the first television station in a colony of the British Empire, as well as the first television station in a predominantly Chinese city. It initially offered a four-hour-per-day English language and Chinese language service. The installation fee during its launch was HK$25, with an equipment rental fee of $45, and a monthly subscription charge of $36.

The charge was considered expensive, at a time when the average worker in Hong Kong earned HK$100 per month. Hong Kong tea shops once again provided an outlet for the broadcasts to the working class who could not afford the subscription fees.

When competitor TVB made its first free-to-air broadcast on 19 November 1967, RTV had 67,000 subscribers. It was renamed Rediffusion Television Limited (RTV) on 1 June 1973 when it was granted its free-to-air terrestrial broadcasting license. Cable television broadcasts were ceased thereafter. On 24 September 1982 it was renamed as Asia Television (ATV).

See also
 Television in Hong Kong
 Commercial Radio Hong Kong

References

Defunct television networks
Television stations in Hong Kong
Television channels and stations established in 1957
Asia Television
Defunct companies of Hong Kong
Television channels and stations disestablished in 1982